A Ilha dos Amores is a 1982 Portuguese-Japanese drama film directed by Paulo Rocha. It was entered into the 1982 Cannes Film Festival.

Cast
 Luís Miguel Cintra - Wenceslau de Moraes
 Clara Joana - Isabel / Venus
 Zita Duarte - Francesca
 Jorge Silva Melo - Painter
 Paulo Rocha - Camilo Pessanha
 Yoshiko Mita - O-Yoné
 Atsuko Murakumo - Ko-Haru
 Jun Toyokawa - Asatarô
 Erl Tenni - Atchan
 Lai Wang - Chinese mother

References

External links

1982 films
1982 drama films
Portuguese drama films
Japanese drama films
1980s Portuguese-language films
1980s Japanese-language films
Films directed by Paulo Rocha
Japan–Portugal relations
1980s Japanese films